Anti-Jo1 is an anti-nuclear antibody.

Anti-Jo1 has been associated with inflammatory myopathies such as polymyositis, dermatomyositis and antisynthetase syndrome.

It has histidine-tRNA ligase as a target.

References

Autoantibodies